The following is a list of free funk musicians.

A

B
Lester Bowie

C
James Chance
Steve Coleman
Ornette Coleman

D
Jack DeJohnette

H
Doug Hammond
Human Arts Ensemble

J
Ronald Shannon Jackson
Juju

O
Greg Osby

P
Ponga

R
Ned Rothenberg

S

T
Craig Taborn
Jamaaladeen Tacuma
Gary Thomas

U
James "Blood" Ulmer

W
 Cassandra Wilson

References

Free funk
 
 Free funk